"The One with All the Thanksgivings" (also known as "The One with the Thanksgiving Flashbacks") is the eighth episode of the fifth season of Friends. It first aired on the NBC network in the United States on November 19, 1998. In the episode, the main characters spend Thanksgiving at Monica's (Courteney Cox) apartment and begin telling stories about their worst Thanksgivings: Chandler (Matthew Perry) learning of his parents' divorce, Phoebe (Lisa Kudrow) losing arms in past lives and Joey (Matt LeBlanc) having his head stuck in a turkey. Rachel (Jennifer Aniston) reveals Monica's worst Thanksgiving—accidentally cutting off Chandler's toe after he called her "fat" in their first encounter. When Monica begs Chandler to forgive her, he accidentally reveals that he loves her.

The episode was directed by Kevin S. Bright and written by Gregory S. Malins. It guest-stars Elliott Gould and Christina Pickles as Jack and Judy Geller, with a cameo appearance by Morgan Fairchild as Nora Tyler Bing. The idea was conceived by the writers, who suggested short stories about the "worst Thanksgivings ever". A flashback approach was incorporated as the producers realized the audience responded well to it, despite concern the episode might be confused for a clip show.

In its original broadcast the episode reached a 16.0 Nielsen rating and finished the week ranked second. The episode earned Debra McGuire a Primetime Emmy Award nomination for Outstanding Costume Design for a Series. Since airing, it frequently ranks high in polls about the series' best episode.

Synopsis
Ross's (David Schwimmer) complaint that his divorce and eviction means he is having the worst Thanksgiving ever prompts the others to tell their stories. Chandler (Matthew Perry) reminds everyone of when his parents told him they were divorcing. Phoebe (Lisa Kudrow) then tells a story from a past life when she was an American Civil War nurse in 1862 and lost an arm, though Ross objects, with the demand of only tales of present lives.

Rachel (Jennifer Aniston) says she knows Monica's (Courteney Cox) worst Thanksgiving, but Phoebe interrupts with a story about the time Joey (Matt LeBlanc) had a turkey stuck on his head in 1992. Unsuccessful at pulling the turkey off Joey's head, which he had put on to scare Chandler, Phoebe enlists help from Monica, who needs to bring the turkey to feed a dinner party at her parents' house. Phoebe and Monica continue to pull at the turkey off of Joey's head until Chandler arrives and is scared by Joey.

Monica tells of what she thinks is her worst Thanksgiving. In 1987, Monica and Rachel are 18 years old and seniors in high school, and an overweight Monica spends time comforting Rachel, after Chip ends their relationship. Ross and Chandler arrive from college to spend Thanksgiving with Ross and Monica's parents, who are unamused upon learning that Chandler hates Thanksgiving and does not eat Thanksgiving food. Monica, who develops a crush on Chandler, cooks macaroni and cheese for him instead. Chandler enjoys the food and tells Monica she should become a chef, which she later does. When Ross learns of Rachel's breakup, he asks Chandler to stay overnight in the hope of getting a date with her, but Chandler refuses, claiming that he does not want to be stuck with "your fat sister" Monica. Overhearing the conversation from behind the door, Monica breaks down in tears and storms out.

Back in the present, Chandler apologizes to Monica for calling her fat. Rachel reveals that is not the story she was referring to. The flashbacks continue to 1988; Ross and Chandler arrive for dinner to find that Monica has slimmed down, and Chandler now finds her attractive. Monica tells Rachel that she wants to humiliate Chandler for calling her fat, so Rachel suggests tricking him into taking off his clothes. Monica tries to seduce Chandler by rubbing various objects, including a knife, against her skin. It comes off as unnatural and she accidentally drops the knife, which severs his toe. He is rushed to the hospital to have it reattached but, in the commotion, Monica inadvertently mixes up the toe with a carrot.

In the present, Chandler becomes upset after learning that he had lost his toe because he called Monica fat, and angrily leaves. When Monica comes by his apartment seeking his forgiveness by putting a turkey on her head, she entertains him by putting a fez and a pair of large sunglasses on the turkey and does a funny dance for him. He is so amused that he inadvertently tells her he loves her for the first time in their relationship. He nervously tries to deny it and Monica ends up scaring Joey when he arrives at the door.

A tag scene shows another of Phoebe's past life memories as she serves in a World War I field hospital in 1915 and again loses an arm.

Production

"The One with All the Thanksgivings" was written by Gregory S. Malins and directed by Kevin S. Bright. It is the fifth Thanksgiving special in the Friends series. The producers knew from past recordings that the audience responded well to seeing "the Friends as they were" and decided to incorporate a flashback episode into a Thanksgiving special. Show creator David Crane considered the Thanksgiving-themed episode as the "hallmark show" in each season. Marta Kauffman added dialogue centering on six characters being together in a room made the holiday special work. When discussing story ideas, the writers decided to create "a bunch of little pieces", until someone suggested "what if it's the worst Thanksgivings?", later used as the hook. Working on a flashback meant the episode needed "to have meaning" as the story continues in the present. It was difficult to keep the characters, particularly Chandler, spontaneously mad for something that happened "years ago". The comedic content was bigger than usual, because Phoebe's arm was blown off and Joey's head stuck in a turkey.

Many scenes were shot in advance. The producers disliked filming beforehand as they preferred "the audience to tell us what's good and what's bad." They also were concerned that a flashback episode would be mistaken for a clip show, but felt it would be believable because they were "flashing so far back into the past." According to Kauffman, certain scenes filmed in the apartment were shot in advance because "it was all over the place"; the cast were tired and full and their energy levels were low. Special effects and costume changes meant "three or four scenes" were also pre-shot to ensure the dialogue was happening in front of the audience. This was completed in two days.

Elliott Gould and Christina Pickles reprised their roles as Jack and Judy Geller. The set for the Geller house was used previously in "The One Where Joey Moves Out", for Jack's birthday party and in the season seven episode "The One Where Rosita Dies", when Ross and Monica visit their parent's garage. The flashback in Thanksgiving 1987 was Monica and Chandler's first meeting along with Rachel and Chandler. Bright commented that the show tries not to contradict itself; "once we establish something, we try not to undo it." In "The Pilot" it appears Rachel meets Chandler for the first time. She also meets him in a later flashback episode, "The One Where The Stripper Cries". To excuse the continuity error, Bright adds they do not remember each other meeting because they look different.

A special rubber and foam turkey  was created for Joey and Monica to place on their heads for sanitary and insurance reasons. A weaving, invisible to the audience, was placed in the middle of the turkey to allow the character to see. Chandler's "flock of seagulls" hairstyle, mentioned in a previous episode, was based on the 1980s time period. For safety, the scene where Monica severed Chandler's toe was pre-shot. Originally the sound of a knife slashing through Chandler's shoe was placed, but according to Crane it "got a little too graphic". Dramatic music was dubbed over instead.

Cultural references
The inspiration for Phoebe's character spurting blood was  Dan Aykroyd's  Julia Child sketch on Saturday Night Live.  In the sketch, Aykroyd plays Julia Child who accidentally cuts her finger, causing blood to spurt everywhere. The turkey stuck on Joey's head is a reference to Act 4 in "Merry Christmas, Mr. Bean" from Mr. Bean. Ross and Chandler's costumes in 1988 were inspired by Miami Vice, which was popular at the time. The music used in Chandler's accident was "The Murder" from Alfred Hitchcock's Psycho.

Reception

In its original airing, the show finished second in ratings for the week of November 16–22, 1998, with a Nielsen rating of 16.0, equivalent to approximately 15.5 million households. It was the network's second highest-rated show that week, after ER, which aired on the same night. The episode premiered in the United Kingdom on Sky1 on February 25, 1999 and reached 1.88 million viewers which made it the most watched show that week. It aired on Channel 4 on August 27, 1999 and was watched by 4.40 million viewers making Friends the channel's third-highest rated program for the week ending August 29, 1999.

Entertainment Weekly rated the episode "B+" and called the "pre-nose job" Rachel and "Fat Monica" great sight gags. It cited Joey's line "It's not so much an underpant as it is a feat of engineering" (in reference to a thong) as the best of the episode. The authors of Friends Like Us: The Unofficial Guide to Friends wrote "This unusual episode is one of the series' best ever, with the non-stop comedy roller-coaster suddenly throwing a brilliant surprise ending at you".

Debra McGuire was nominated for a Primetime Emmy Award for Outstanding Costume Design for a Series, while the mixers were nominated for Outstanding Sound Mixing for a Comedy Series or a Special. The popularity of this episode placed it on one of the first Region 1 "best of" DVD releases. It was also released as part of Friends: The Complete Fifth Season in Regions 1, 2, and 4.

In 2004, "The One with All the Thanksgivings" was ranked fifth in a list of the top 10 Friends episodes by the Daily Herald and in 2010, was identified as one of the five best Thanksgiving-themed episodes by Contra Costa Times.

In a 2021 program on ITV Mr. Bean writer Richard Curtis said they had been accused of copying the turkey on the head joke from Friends, when in fact they had created the joke first in 1992 for Merry Christmas Mr. Bean and later revived it in 1997 for the film Bean. He accused the Friends writers of stealing the joke whilst Rowan Atkinson said that jokes are there to inspire, not to be stolen.

References

External links

1998 American television episodes
Friends (season 5) episodes
Thanksgiving television episodes